The South Korean football champions are the winners of the highest league in South Korean football, which is currently the K League 1.

Since the league turned professional in 1983, Jeonbuk Hyundai Motors has won nine titles, the record for most titles won. Seongnam FC has won the league seven times, followed by FC Seoul on six occasions, and Pohang Steelers with five titles. Jeonbuk Hyundai Motors is also the only team that won the title for four consecutive seasons.

National Semi-professional League (1964–1982)

 Before a professional football league was founded in South Korea, there was a semi-professional league held twice a year. South Korean companies, banks and militaries' football clubs qualified for the Semi-professional League, but university clubs didn't participate in it unlike the National Football Championship. Instead, they could enter the National University League.

K League (1983–2012)

 Professional and semi-professional football clubs competed together between 1983 and 1986. Since 1987, only professional football clubs competed in the league.
 This league was founded with the name "Super League". It was renamed "Football Festival" in 1986, "Korean Professional Football League" in 1987, "Korean League" in 1994, "Professional Football League" in 1996, and "K League" in 1998.

K League 1 (2013–present)

 The K League was split into two divisions in 2013.
 The first division was originally named "K League Classic", but it was renamed "K League 1" in 2018.

Statistics

All-time (1964–present)
 In South Korea, professional era records are generally accepted.

Titles by club 
Clubs in bold are competing in the K League.
The asterisk means co-winners.

Professional era (1983–present)

Titles by club 

 In accordance with the official K League policy, the current clubs inherit the history and records of the predecessor clubs.

Titles by city/province
 In early years, hometowns of K League clubs were determined, but they were pointless in substance because the clubs played games by going around all stadiums together. 
 The current home and away system is being operated since the 1987 season.

Titles by region 
 In early years, hometowns of K League clubs were determined, but they were pointless in substance because the clubs played games by going around all stadiums together. 
 The current home and away system is being operated since 1987 season.

See also 
 Football in South Korea
 Korean Semi-professional Football League
 K League
 South Korean football league system
 List of Korean FA Cup winners

References

Champions
Champions
Korea, South
Champions